Megachile zebrella is a species of bee in the family Megachilidae. It was described by Pasteels in 1973.

References

Zebrella
Insects described in 1973